Hartlington is a village and civil parish in the Craven district of North Yorkshire, England. At the 2011 Census, the population of the parish was around 50. Details are included in the civil parish of Hebden, North Yorkshire. It is near Burnsall and 2.84 miles south-east of Grassington. Hartlington Raikes, one of the main roads in Hartlington, goes from the village centre to the B6265 approximately 1.5 miles away. It then turns into Hartlington Moor Lane which goes up to Grimwith Reservoir.

It is one of the contenders for the smallest and least populous village in the Yorkshire Dales, but what it lacks in size, it makes up for its outstanding natural beauty – and even though it is small, it and the surrounding villages are at the centre of attention of hikers and tourists. Hartlington is home to Wharfe House Farm Car Park, which is a very popular spot for tourists and residents of the nearby towns and villages to visit and relax on the banks of the River Wharfe.

References

External links

Villages in North Yorkshire
Civil parishes in North Yorkshire
Wharfedale